Dasypodia selenophora, the southern old lady moth, is a moth of the family Noctuidae. The species was first described by Achille Guenée in 1852. It is found in the southern half of Australia, as well as Norfolk Island, New Zealand and Macquarie Island.

The wingspan is about 90 mm.

The larvae feed on Acacia species.

Gallery

References

Catocalinae
Moths of New Zealand
Moths of Australia
Moths described in 1852